Philip Sugden could refer to:

Philip Sugden (born 1949), English artist
Philip Sugden (1947–2014), English historian